Magstatt-le-Bas is a commune in the Haut-Rhin department in Alsace in north-eastern France.

See also
 Communes of the Haut-Rhin département
 Magstatt-le-Haut

References

Communes of Haut-Rhin